Directions in Music is a Canadian music television miniseries which aired on CBC Television in 1961.

Premise
This Vancouver production featured five episodes of various musical forms.

Scheduling
This half-hour series was broadcast Sundays at 4:30 p.m. (Eastern) from 23 April to 21 May 1961.

Episodes

 "Apollo and Hyacinth", a 1949 composition by Hans Werner Henze, was sung by Winona Denyes (mezzo-soprano) with musicians conducted by John Avison
 Lloyd Powell provided discussion and a performance of post-Bach piano music
 Intimate opera was featured, including a London Intimate Opera Company performance of Thomas Arne's Thomas and Sally Works by Purcell and Offenbach were also noted in this episode.
 James Joyce's compositions
 A recital of madrigals by the Vancouver Cantata Singers under conductor Hugh McLean

References

External links
 

CBC Television original programming
1961 Canadian television series debuts
1961 Canadian television series endings